Berea Park F.C. was a South African football club based in Pretoria. In the 1940s they participated in the Transvaal First Division. They were previously known as Pretoria South African Railway until their name change in 1935.  Merged with Pretoria City and took their place in the NFL before the 1960-season.

They later participated in the all-white National Football League of South Africa.

Honours 

 Ward and Salomons Cup winner: 1953
 Transvaal Challenge Cup winner: 1953, 1987

References 

Association football clubs established in 1935
Defunct soccer clubs in South Africa
National Football League (South Africa) clubs
Soccer clubs in Pretoria